Simona Dobrá (born 24 June 1987) is a retired Czech tennis player.

Dobrá won two singles and 21 doubles titles on the ITF tour in her career. On 15 September 2008, she reached her best singles ranking of world number 514. On 8 June 2009, she peaked at world number 241 in the doubles rankings.

In June 2008, partnering Tereza Hladíková, Dobrá won the $75,000 ITF tournament in Zlín, defeating Lucie Hradecká and Renata Voráčová in the final.

Dobrá retired from tennis 2012.

ITF finals (23–12)

Singles (2–2)

Doubles (21–10)

References

External links 
 
 

1987 births
Living people
Sportspeople from Olomouc
Czech female tennis players